Timeless Heart is an album by the Timeless All Stars featuring trombonist Curtis Fuller, saxophonist Harold Land, vibraphonist Bobby Hutcherson, and pianist Cedar Walton that was recorded in 1982 and released by the Dutch Timeless label.

Reception

Allmusic awarded the album 4 stars, stating: "All star sextet with auspicious beginnings ... A bright, clean, happy sound. Extension of MJQ".

Track listing 
All compositions by Cedar Walton except where noted
 "Hindsight" – 5:43
 "Tayamisha" (Buster Williams) – 5:59
 "Hand in Glove" – 5:20
 "Fiesta Espagnol" – 7:38
 "World Peace" (Harold Land) – 6:07
 "Christina" (Williams) – 4:04

Personnel 
Curtis Fuller – trombone
Harold Land – tenor saxophone
Bobby Hutcherson – vibraphone
Cedar Walton – piano 
Buster Williams – bass
Billy Higgins – drums

References 

1983 albums
Cedar Walton albums
Curtis Fuller albums
Harold Land albums
Bobby Hutcherson albums
Buster Williams albums
Billy Higgins albums
Timeless Records albums
Albums recorded at Van Gelder Studio